State Route 185 (SR 185) is a primary state highway in the U.S. state of Virginia. Known as Stoney Creek Boulevard, the state highway runs  from SR 675 and SR 686 near Edinburg east to U.S. Route 11 (US 11) in Edinburg. SR 185 serves as a connector between Edinburg and Interstate 81 (I-81) in central Shenandoah County.

Route description

SR 185 begins at a three-way intersection at the southern end of SR 686 (South Ox Road) just west of Edinburg. The road continues west as SR 675 (Stoney Creek Road); that secondary highway has a signed concurrency with SR 185, although the secondary highway is not officially part of the primary highway. SR 185 heads southeast through a diamond interchange with I-81 and enters the town of Edinburg running parallel to Stony Creek to the south. The state highway has a grade crossing of Norfolk Southern Railway's B-Line before reaching its eastern terminus at US 11 (Main Street) at the west end of downtown Edinburg.

Major intersections

References

External links

Virginia Highways Project: VA 185

185
State Route 185